Barbara Rudnik (27 July 1958 – 23 May 2009) was a German actress.

Selected filmography

External links
 

1958 births
2009 deaths
German film actresses
German television actresses
20th-century German actresses
21st-century German actresses